Zolotarevskyella is a genus of beetles in the family Carabidae, containing the following species:

 Zolotarevskyella afghana Mateu, 1976
 Zolotarevskyella rhytidera (Chaudoir, 1876)
 Zolotarevskyella strigicollis (Wollaston, 1867)

References

Lebiinae